The 2010 BWF World Championships was the 18th tournament of the World Badminton Championships. It was held at Stade Pierre de Coubertin in Paris, France, from August 23 to August 29, 2010. Following the results of the women's singles.

Seeds

 Wang Yihan (third round)
 Saina Nehwal (quarterfinals)
 Wang Xin (finalist)
 Tine Baun (semifinals)
 Pi Hongyan (quarterfinals)
 Wang Shixian (semifinals)
 Wang Lin (champion)
 Juliane Schenk (third round)
 Zhou Mi (first round, retired)
 Eriko Hirose (quarterfinals)
 Yao Jie (third round)
 Yip Pui Yin (third round)
 Ella Diehl (third round)
 Bae Seung-hee (second round)
 Petya Nedelcheva (third round)
 Kim Moon-hi (third round)

Main stage

Section 1

Section 2

Section 3

Section 4

Final stage

External links
Official website
tournamentsoftware.com

2010 BWF World Championships
BWF